The 1998 E3 Harelbeke was the 41st edition of the E3 Harelbeke cycle race and was held on 28 March 1998. The race started and finished in Harelbeke. The race was won by Johan Museeuw of the TVM team.

General classification

References

1998 in Belgian sport
1998
March 1998 sports events in Europe